Guanwu National Forest Recreation Area is a forest located in Wufeng Township, Hsinchu County and Tai'an Township, Miaoli County in Taiwan.

Geology
It has several waterfalls; the  Guanwu Waterfall is the most notable one.

See also
 Geography of Taiwan

References

Geography of Hsinchu County
Geography of Miaoli County
National forest recreation areas in Taiwan
Tourist attractions in Hsinchu County
Tourist attractions in Miaoli County